Henry John "Harry, Con" Corbeau (May 8, 1885 – June 1, 1920) was a Canadian professional ice hockey defenceman in the National Hockey Association for the Toronto Blueshirts. Corbeau was a member of the Blueshirts when they won the Stanley Cup in 1914. Corbeau's brother Bert also played professional ice hockey. Both Corbeau brothers are distant cousins of Ted Lindsay.

Playing career
Born in Penetanguishene, Ontario, Corbeau played senior ice hockey with Toronto St. Georges and Victoria Harbour, before signing as a professional with the Pittsburgh Professionals of the International Professional Hockey League in 1905. In one of the earliest trades of a player, Pittsburgh traded him to the Calumet Miners in exchange for the Miners' vote to reinstate Hod Stuart. Corbeau played for both Calumet and the Canadian Soo teams that season as well as Pittsburgh. The following season, he signed with the Portage Lakes Hockey Club but was released and finished the season with Calumet. In 1907, he signed with the Toronto Pros of the OPHL, and played in their unsuccessful challenge of the Montreal Wanderers for the Stanley Cup.

Corbeau signed for the next season with Pittsburgh Athletic Club of the Western Pennsylvania Hockey League in 1908, but jumped his contract to re-sign with Toronto. Later that season, he jumped his contract with Toronto to play for the Haileybury Comets. In 1909, he re-signed with Haileybury for the new NHA, but he did not play a game. The following year, he stayed with Haileybury went it returned to the TPHL, although he finished the season with the Berlin Dutchmen of the OPHL. In 1912, he joined the new Toronto Tecumsehs of the NHA. He moved the following season to the Toronto Blueshirts and was a member of their Stanley Cup-winning squad. He played his final season of 1914–15 with the Glace Bay Miners of the Nova Scotia Eastern Pro League. He coached after his playing days with Port Arthur Columbus Club before returning home to Penetanguishene, and died in 1920 of internal bleeding of his heart.

References

1885 births
1920 deaths
Calumet Miners players
Haileybury Comets players
Ice hockey people from Ontario
Pittsburgh Athletic Club (ice hockey) players
Pittsburgh Professionals players
Portage Lakes Hockey Club players
Sault Ste. Marie Marlboros players
Stanley Cup champions
Toronto Blueshirts players
Toronto Tecumsehs players
Canadian ice hockey defencemen